Featherdale Wildlife Park is a zoo located in Doonside, Sydney, Australia. The park contains various species native to Australia, and is known to be one of the world's largest collections of Australian fauna. The facility provides displays, events and interactive experiences. It specialises in Australian native wildlife and birds, as well as reptiles and marsupials. The premises is accredited by the Zoo Aquarium Association Australia.

History

Featherdale is located on what was originally a  plot of land owned by Charles and Marjorie Wigg, which they purchased in 1953, in what was then a poultry farm. It was opened in 1972, by their son-in-law Bruce Kubbere, who had studied fauna. The park initially opened as a nursery, lined with Australian native trees and plants, in conjunction with a wildlife park. It was threatened with closure in 1975 by rezoning and development for public housing, but the decision was reversed by premier Sir Robert Askin. In 1996 the park won in the category of significant tourist attraction at the Australian Tourism Awards.

In December 2016, the NSW Government's Planning Assessment Commission visited the premises for a tour and meeting. The involved parties gathered to assess the functions of Featherdale Wildlife Park with regards to a proposed development of Sydney Zoo.

Featherdale won the best NSW Major Tourist Attraction award in 2005 and 2009. Many celebrities have visited Featherdale, including Leonardo DiCaprio, Will Smith, Gwen Stefani, Kristen Stewart, Taylor Lautner, Robert De Niro, Matt Damon, Dave Grohl and Smokey Robinson.

In November 2019, Featherdale Wildlife Park management bought Mogo Zoo from Sally Padey (Mogo's owner for over 30 years), and commenced management from the end of the month. Since the new ownership, the park closed on two occasions. Closures occurred due to the COVID-19 pandemic and fires that occurred on the south east coast of NSW. Featherdale Wildlife Park stated that the closures had significant impacts on the animals that were conditioned to constant attention from visitors.

Visitation 
In 2016 the park estimated that it had served 11.5 million visitors since its opening.

Sources of visitors 
The rates of domestic and international visitors vary on the global environment. Upon the onset of the COVID-19 pandemic, around half of visitors were thought to be international. The tight restrictions on international travel into Australia thus led to a significant reduction in visitation numbers. However, the Mogo Wildlife Park, which was not a significant international tourism destination, was not as affected. Around 2014, domestic and International visitors were relatively similar, with 47 per cent international visitors. In 2016, of its 400,000 annual visitors, 180,000 were from Australia, including 65,000 from Western Sydney.

Facilities and amenities 
Featherdale is located in Doonside, part of Western Sydney, approximately 40 kilometres from the CBD. Its  include animal enclosures and display areas, as well as visitor facilities such as picnic spaces, shops, and basic amenities.

Featherdale Wildlife Park provides various facilities that cater to the convenience of visitors, the assistance of those with impairments and basic essential amenities.

The premises is a ZAA-accredited (Zoo Aquarium Association Australasia) facility, ensuring that the wildlife park cooperates with state and federal government standards and legislation.

Basic facilities 
Featherdale Wildlife Park includes a variety of facilities and amenities aside from the animal attractions. These are for the use of visitors, extending to tourists, businesses events and school trips. The facilities include:

 Car park near premises entrance with 100–120 spaces
 Two picnic area
 Three bathrooms
 A two-story café
 An information centre
 Gift shop
 Function centre
 First aid
 And a school assembly point.

Disability amenities 

 Wheelchair access
 Companion Card – allows for the carers of disabled people to gain free entry into the premises and related events
 And supports programs for disabled and disadvantaged people.

Exhibits and wildlife collection

Animals 

The park contains various species native to Australia, and is known to be one of the world's largest collections of Australian fauna. Some of these are endangered in the wild like the Tasmanian devil and plains-wanderer. The park's collection includes kangaroos, wallabies, koalas, wombats, short-beaked echidnas, quokkas, bilbies, dingos, bats, emus, southern cassowaries, little penguins, saltwater crocodiles, and several other mammals, reptiles and birds. The facility contains around 2000 individual animals within 260 species.

Interactive animal encounters 

The wildlife park allows for up-close encounters with many different species. Interactive species encounters include kangaroo feeding and koala, penguin and quokka encounters.

Featherdale describes itself as such:
"Featherdale is the largest exhibitor of native Australian fauna in the world, caring for over 1700 birds and animals on site, with more than 300 species of birds and animals being on display, including some of Australia's most iconic animal. Featherdale cares for the largest collection of koalas in the state and is an industry leader in the medical care of the species."

Breeding, conservation and study contributions 
Featherdale Wildlife Park has assisted in several breeding and conservation programs. These programs allow for a controlled understanding of species as the facility keeps captive species within strict diets and conditions. Featherdale Wildlife Park provided access, samples and related materials to these studies and reports.

Tiger quolls
Featherdale Wildlife Park contributed to a tiger quoll study conducted at the University of Wollongong. They provided the university with access to the breeding patterns of the captive specimens. The park also allowed for observations of the ‘growth and development of their young’. The study resulted in a comparison of species that were in captivity in the park compared to wild populations in Sydney and around the NSW coastline.
The park supplied quoll faeces samples to the University of New South Wales in 2005 to study odours and predators in various ‘Critical Weight Range (CWR) marsupials. Quoll urine was provided to the ‘Ultraviolet properties of Australian mammal urine’ study c.2003.

Koalas
C. Staples from Featherdale Wildlife Park provided samples for a study on koalas, their genomes and the relationship with decreasing population numbers.
A study of the genetic make-up of koalas and differences between captive and wild population was conducted with specialists from several major universities including the Queensland University of Technology and the University of New South Wales. Featherdale Wildlife Park allowed access to 11 animals containing seven individuals and four offspring.

Short-beaked echidnas
In 2011, Featherdale Wildlife Park allowed researchers from the University of New South Wales to observe their echidnas, which were specified to be wild before captivity and were judged to be viewed in good health when observed. The park provided several faecal samples of their echidnas to assist in the analysis of long-term captive short-beaked echidnas.

Yellow-footed rock-wallabies
In 1997, Featherdale Wildlife Park contributed to a genetic study conducted by Macquarie University. The park provided samples for an analysis of the yellow-footed rock wallaby's DNA. The study provided links between issues the wallaby's DNA predisposed them to and their management in captivity.

Common wombats
Scat samples of common wombats were provided to the Western Sydney University to understand the impacts of stress and parasites. The samples provided insight into the basic biology of the wombats and the decline of their population.

Common brushtail possums and related predators
Featherdale Wildlife Park provided "fresh-frozen" owl pellets to study common brushtail possum behaviour.

Thefts

Collett's snakes
On 18 October 2006, intruders broke into Featherdale Wildlife Park's reptile enclosure and stole four Collett's snakes.

Emu
In 2013, a five-year-old female emu was stolen around 13 February 2013.

Exotic birds
Over the Christmas period in 2012, a robbery resulted in the theft of ten exotic birds. The birds were of various species and included two blue-and-yellow macaws. The value of the theft was well in excess of $12,000. Police believed the birds, which are often kept as pets, were stolen to be sold on the black market or were given as Christmas gifts. All the birds were microchipped. Two of the ten stolen birds were recovered from a police raid on a house in Sydney's west where the birds were being kept as pets. The two birds were returned to the park and seemed to be in decent health, other than some signs of stress.

Ownership and management

Ownership 
Featherdale Wildlife Park is a privately owned enterprise that has declared that their receive no government funding or financial support. The ownership of Featherdale Wildlife Park has been transferred several times. In December 1996 it was purchased by Amalgamated Holding Limited (now Event Hospitality and Entertainment) owned Featherdale Wildlife Park as part of their investment in leisure and attractions for $5.5 million. In July 2013, it was purchased by Moss Capital for around AUD $15 million. It was reported that the management style and team, and cash flow attracted the current owners to its acquisition. Moss Capital later became the Elanor fund, which continues to hold the property. The Elanor Wildlife Park Fund was launched after the acquisition of Mogo Zoo, to potentially acquire further wildlife attractions.

Management 
In 2014, the park was run by the general manager, Tim Sinclair-Smith. Previous owners, Moss Capital, have stated that the style of management and team at the premises are a reason the park is an attractive asset and functioning business. The staff caring for the animals on the premises were in excess of 100 in 2013. There are approximately 73 staff at Featherdale Wildlife Park.

Profit 
In 2013, Featherdale Wildlife Park produced an income of around $9.2 million. Elanor Investor Group claimed a profit of $2 million in the fourth quarter of 2020 when disclosing their earnings. They elaborated that Featherdale Wildlife Park had decreased the most in profit, relative to their other assets and went on to state that profit had begun to decline as a result of the border restrictions, impacts of the COVID-19 pandemic. Profits took a hit due to the park's high reliance on international and inter-state tourism.

Costs 
In 2013, the total cost for the running of the premises was estimated at approximately $6.5 million, including the feeding and care of the animals. The costs of running Featherdale Wildlife Park are expensive, with the animal feeding costs estimating about $187,000 annually in 2013. In addition to feeding costs, the security of the park and the enclosures cost Featherdale Wildlife Park approximately $200,000 annually. General manager, Tim Sinclair-Smith, has stated that the profitability of the park as a business is required to run operations and to support breeding and conservation projects.

Due to the challenges of closures due to the COVID-19 pandemic and the lowering of profit levels, the park received part of the governments $95 million relief package for zoos and wildlife facilities. The relief package provided relief for costs due to the pressure of the breeding period combined with job losses.

Competition 
Featherdale Wildlife Park operates under competition with other zoo and wildlife parks in Sydney. Featherdale Wildlife Park voiced objection to the construction of Sydney Zoo, stating that the zoo's location and facilities would create "social and economic issues". The NSW Planning Association looked into the impacts in a formal investigation, comparing the proposed development, Featherdale Wildlife Park and Taronga Zoo, another large zoo in Sydney. The report found that Sydney Zoo was very likely to impact the "high level of social engagement with the local community" and could possibly result in park closure, job loss and changes to the local community.

Species

Apostlebird
Australasian figbird
Australian bustard
Australian grass owl
Australian king parrot
Australian magpie
Australian pelican
Australian pied oystercatcher
Australian shelduck
Banded lapwing
Bar-shouldered dove
Barking owl
Baudin’s black cockatoo
Black-breasted button-quail
Black-breasted buzzard
Black-faced woodswallow
Black-necked stork
Black-throated finch
Blue-billed duck
Blue-faced parrot-finch
Blue-winged parrot
Boobook owl
Bourke’s parrot
Brown cuckoo-dove
Brown quail
Brush bronzewing
Budgerigar
Buff-banded rail
Bush stone-curlew
Cape Barren goose
Cattle egret
Channel-billed cuckoo
Chestnut rail
Chestnut-breasted mannikin
Chiming wedgebill
Cinnamon quail-thrush
Cloncurry ringneck parrot
Cockatiel
Common bronzewing
Crested bellbird
Crimson chat
Crimson finch
Diamond dove
Diamond firetail
Double-barred finch
Eastern barn owl
Eastern koel
Eastern osprey
Eastern spinebill
Eastern whipbird
Eastern yellow robin
Eclectus parrot
Elegant parrot
Emu
Eurasian skylark
Flock bronzewing
Forest kingfisher
Forest red-tailed black cockatoo
Galah
Gang-gang cockatoo
Glossy black-cockatoo
Glossy ibis
Golden pheasant
Golden-shouldered parrot
Gouldian finch
Great egret
Greater bluebonnet
Green catbird
Green-winged macaw
Grey shrike-thrush
Hooded parrot
Inland dotterel
Kelp gull
King quail
Laughing kookaburra
Lesser sooty owl
Little black cormorant
Little lorikeet
Little penguin
Little pied cormorant
Long-tailed finch
Luzon bleeding-heart dove
Major Mitchell’s cockatoo
Malleefowl
Masked finch
Masked lapwing
Masked woodswallow
Metallic starling
Mulga parrot
Musk lorikeet
Nankeen kestrel
Nicobar pigeon
Noisy friarbird
Noisy pitta
Northern rosella
Olive-backed oriole
Pacific emerald dove
Pacific gull
Painted button-quail
Painted finch
Pale-headed rosella
Peaceful dove
Pheasant coucal
Pied cormorant
Pied stilt
Plumed whistling-duck
Powerful owl
Princess parrot
Purple-crowned fairywren
Purple-crowned lorikeet
Radjah shelduck
Rainbow bee-eater
Rainbow lorikeet
Red lory
Red-backed button-quail
Red-browed finch
Red-chested button-quail
Red-collared lorikeet
Red-rumped parrot
Red-tailed black-cockatoo
Red-whiskered bulbul
Regent bowerbird
Regent honeyeater
Rose-crowned fruit dove
Rufous owl
Satin bowerbird
Scaly-breasted lorikeet
Scarlet honeyeater
Silver gull
Silvereye
Southern cassowary
Spinifex pigeon
Spotted bowerbird
Squatter pigeon
Star finch
Striped honeyeater
Stubble quail
Sulphur-crested cockatoo
Superb fairywren
Superb fruit-dove
Superb lyrebird
Swift parrot
Tawny frogmouth
Topknot pigeon
Torresian imperial-pigeon
Tricoloured munia
Turquoise parrot
Varied lorikeet
Variegated fairywren
White-breasted ground dove
White-breasted woodswallow
White-cheeked honeyeater
White-faced heron
White-headed pigeon
White-naped honeyeater
White-winged chough
Wonga pigeon
Yellow-rumped mannikin
Yellow-tailed black cockatoo
Yellow-tufted honeyeater
Zebra finch

Bennett’s wallaby
Bilby
Brush-tailed rock-wallaby
Common wallaroo
Common wombat
Dingo
Eastern grey kangaroo
Ghost bat
Goodfellow's tree-kangaroo
Kangaroo Island grey kangaroo
Koala
Parma wallaby
Quokka
Red-necked pademelon
Short-beaked echidna
Southern hairy-nosed wombat
Tammar wallaby
Tasmanian devil
Tiger quoll

Australian scrub python
Boyd’s forest dragon
Broad-headed snake
Broad-shelled river turtle
Brown tree snake
Centralian blue-tongue lizard
Centralian python
Collett’s snake
Common death adder
Eastern bearded dragon
Eastern blue-tongued lizard
Eastern pilbara spiny-tailed skink
Eastern water dragon
Eastern water skink
Frilled lizard
Inland taipan
Jungle carpet python
Lace monitor
Macquarie turtle
Olive python
Perentie
Saltwater crocodile
Saw-shelled turtle
Tiger snake
Woma python

References

Zoos in New South Wales
Wildlife parks in Australia
Tourist attractions in Sydney
1972 establishments in Australia